Out On Screen (formally the Vancouver Out On Screen Film & Video Society) is an LGBT-oriented arts organization based in Vancouver, British Columbia, Canada. It began as a small, community-based film festival in 1988 and was registered as a BC society in 1989, in anticipation of the 1990 Gay Games. Since then, Out On Screen has evolved to become a professional arts organization with two key program initiatives: the Vancouver Queer Film Festival, the annual queer film festival in Vancouver, and Out In Schools, a province-wide educational program aimed primarily at high school students, but with program delivery across the education system, that employs film and video to address homophobia, transphobia, and bullying.

Vancouver Queer Film Festival

The Vancouver Queer Film Festival is a film festival that takes place annually during the month of August. The festival was first held publicly in 1988. It is Vancouver's second largest film festival and Western Canada's largest queer arts event.

Festival awards

People's Choice Award for Best Feature

Gerry Brunet Memorial Award
Established in 1997, this juried award is given in recognition of Gerry Brunet, a lifelong contributor to the arts and an early board member at Out On Screen.

People's Choice Awards for Best Short
Originally named for OUTtv's Hot Pink Shorts TV show (The OUTtv Hot Pink Shorts Award), this award recognizes an exceptional short film.

Other programs

Out in Schools

Launched in 2004, Out in Schools brings independent queer films into local high schools in British Columbia. In conjunction with gay–straight alliances, Out in Schools focuses on the serious issues that affect queer youth.
The purpose of Out in Schools is to reduce isolation and increase the safety of the learning environment for queer students in the community. Out in Schools aims to increase understanding through education to combat issues such as homophobia and bullying that threaten the safety of the classrooms for both queer and straight students.
In 2013, Out in Schools expanded its program reach by 25% into new school districts, delivering 100 classroom presentations focused on queer and anti-bullying education to more than 8,200 high school students across BC!

FirstOUT Video Scholarship Program
FirstOUT Video Scholarship Program is an intensive digital filmmaking program for youth aged 16 to 24. This is part of the youth education initiatives which, together with Out In Schools, seeks to give media literacy and production opportunities to queer youth and their allies. It brings independent media artists together with queer youth to work with them on developing their own cultural voice and producing their first video. Since its inception, five films have been produced and exhibited.

2007
Out On Screen had partnered with Pacific Cinematheque to present the first year of the "FirstOUT Video Scholarship Program". The application submission ended in November 2006. By mid-December, four participants were selected and were paired in a one-on-one mentorship with celebrated local independent media artists in Vancouver, British Columbia. The training and production period began in February and ended late June. All of the four short films were screened at the 19th Annual Vancouver Queer Film Festival on August 18, 2007, at Pacific Cinematheque as part of the Youth Series. A youth-friendly reception followed to celebrate the accomplishment of the four young filmmakers, as well as the success of the program.

 In addition to the four mentors above, Gabe Forsythe and Krista Stusiak were the youth mentors from Pacific Cinematheque's Education department who facilitated boot camp workshops on cinematography and technicality of filmmaking.

See also

List of LGBT film festivals
 List of film festivals in Canada

References

External links
 Vancouver Queer Film Festival
 Vancouver Out On Screen Film & Video Society
 Out In Schools
 Queer History Project

Film festivals established in 1989
Film festivals in Vancouver
LGBT film festivals in Canada
LGBT culture in Vancouver
Queer organizations